A flamethrower is a ranged incendiary device designed to project a controllable jet of fire. First deployed by the Byzantine Empire in the 7th century AD, flamethrowers saw use in modern times during World War I, and more widely in World War II as a tactical weapon against fortifications.

Most military flamethrowers use liquid fuel, typically either gasoline or diesel, but commercial flamethrowers are generally blowtorches using gaseous fuels such as propane; gases are safer in peacetime applications, because their flames have less mass flow rate and dissipate faster, and often are easier to extinguish when necessary.

The military use of flamethrowers is restricted through the Protocol on Incendiary Weapons.

Apart from the military applications, flamethrowers have peacetime applications where there is a need for controlled burning, such as in sugarcane harvesting and other land-management tasks. Various forms are designed for an operator to carry, while others are mounted on vehicles.

Military use 

Modern flamethrowers were first used during the trench warfare conditions of World War I and their use greatly increased in World War II. They can be vehicle-mounted, as on a tank, or man-portable.

The man-portable flamethrower consists of two elements—the backpack and the gun. The backpack element usually consists of two or three cylinders. In a two-cylinder system, one cylinder holds compressed, inert propellant gas (usually nitrogen), and the other holds flammable liquid, typically some form of petrochemical. A three-cylinder system often has two outer cylinders of flammable liquid and a central cylinder of propellant gas to maintain the balance of the soldier carrying it. The gas propels the liquid fuel out of the cylinder through a flexible pipe and then into the gun element of the flamethrower system. The gun consists of a small reservoir, a spring-loaded valve, and an ignition system; depressing a trigger opens the valve, allowing pressurized flammable liquid to flow and pass over the igniter and out of the gun nozzle. The igniter can be one of several ignition systems: A simple type is an electrically-heated wire coil; another used a small pilot flame, fueled with pressurized gas from the system.

Flamethrowers were primarily used against battlefield fortifications, bunkers, and other protected emplacements. A flamethrower projects a stream of flammable liquid, rather than flame, which allows bouncing the stream off walls and ceilings to project the fire into unseen spaces, such as inside bunkers or pillboxes. Typically, popular visual media depict the flamethrower as short-ranged and only effective for a few metres (due to the common use of propane gas as the fuel in flamethrowers in movies, for the safety of the actors).

Flamethrowers pose many risks to the operator. The first disadvantage is the weapon's weight and length, which impairs the soldier's mobility. The weapon is limited to only a few seconds of burn time, since it uses fuel very quickly, requiring the operator to be precise and conservative. Flamethrowers using a fougasse-style explosive propellant system also have a limited number of shots. The weapon is very visible on the battlefield, which causes operators to become immediately singled out as prominent targets, especially for snipers and designated marksmen. Flamethrower operators are rarely taken prisoner, especially when their target survived an attack by the weapon; captured flamethrower users were in some cases summarily executed.

The flamethrower's effective range is short in comparison with that of other battlefield weapons of similar size. To be effective, flamethrower soldiers must approach their target, risking exposure to enemy fire. Vehicular flamethrowers also have this problem; they may have considerably greater range than a man-portable flamethrower, but their range is still short compared with that of other infantry weapons.

The risk of a flamethrower operator being caught in the explosion of their weapon due to enemy hits on the tanks is exaggerated in films. In some cases, the pressure tanks have exploded and killed the operator when hit by  bullets or grenade shrapnel.  In the documentary Vietnam in HD, platoon sergeant Charles Brown tells of how one of his men was killed when his flamethrower was hit by grenade shrapnel during the battle for Hill 875.

The pressurizer is filled with a non-flammable gas that is under high pressure. If this tank ruptures, it might knock the operator forward as it was expended in the same way a pressurized aerosol can bursts outward when punctured. The fuel mixture in the containers is difficult to light, which is why magnesium-filled igniters are required when the weapon is fired. When pierced by a bullet, a metal can filled with diesel or napalm will merely leak unless the round is an incendiary type that may ignite the mixture inside.

The best way to minimize the disadvantages of flame weapons was to mount them on armoured vehicles. The Commonwealth and the United States were the most prolific users of vehicle-mounted flame weapons; the British and Canadians fielded "Wasps" (Universal Carriers fitted with flamethrowers) at infantry battalion level, beginning in mid-1944, and eventually incorporating them into infantry battalions. Early tank-mounted flamethrower vehicles included the "Badger" (a converted Ram tank) and the "Oke", used first at Dieppe.

Operation 

A propane-operated flamethrower is a straightforward device. The gas is expelled through the gun assembly by its own pressure and is ignited at the exit of the barrel through piezo ignition.

Liquid-operated flamethrowers use a smaller tank with a pressurized gas to expel the flammable liquid fuel. The propellant gas is fed to two tubes. The first opens in the fuel tanks providing the pressure necessary for expelling the liquid. The other tube leads to an ignition chamber behind the exit of the gun assembly, where it is mixed with air and ignited through piezo ignition. This pre-ignition line is the source of the flame seen in front of the gun assembly in movies and documentaries. As the fuel passes through the flame, it is ignited and propelled towards the target.

History

Ancient Greece 

The concept of throwing fire as a weapon has existed since ancient times. During the Peloponnesian War, Boeotians used some kind of a flamethrower trying to destroy the fortification walls of the Athenians during the Battle of Delium. Later, during the Byzantine era, sailors used rudimentary hand-pumped flamethrowers on board their naval ships. Greek fire, extensively used by the Byzantine Empire, is said to have been invented by Kallinikos of Heliopolis, probably about 673. Byzantine texts described weapons, used by Byzantine land forces, which were shooting Greek fire and called cheirosiphona (χειροσίφωνα, meaning hand-held siphons, singular χειροσίφωνο). The flamethrower found its origins in a device consisting of a hand-held pump that shot bursts of Greek fire via a siphon-hose and a piston which ignited it with a match, similar to modern versions, as it was ejected. An illustration in Poliorcetica of Hero of Byzantium display a soldier with a portable flamethrower.
Greek fire, used primarily at sea, gave the Byzantines a substantial military advantage against enemies such as members of the Arab Empire (who later adopted the use of Greek fire). An 11th-century illustration of its use survives in the John Skylitzes manuscript.

China 

The Pen Huo Qi ("fire spraying device") was a Chinese piston flamethrower that used a substance similar to petrol or naphtha, invented around 919 AD during the Five Dynasties and Ten Kingdoms period. The earliest reference to Greek fire in China was made in 917 AD, written by Wu Renchen in his Spring and Autumn Annals of the Ten Kingdoms. In 919 CE, the siphon projector-pump was used to spread the 'fierce fire oil' that could not be doused with water, as recorded by Lin Yu (林禹) in his Wu-Yue Beishi (吳越備史), hence the first credible Chinese reference to the flamethrower employing the chemical solution of Greek fire. Lin Yu mentioned also that the 'fierce fire oil' derived ultimately from China's contact in the 'southern seas', with Arabia (大食國 Dashiguo). In the Battle of Langshan Jiang (Wolf Mountain River) in 919, the naval fleet of the Wenmu King of Wuyue defeated the fleet of the Kingdom of Wu because he had used 'fire oil' to burn his fleet; this signified the first Chinese use of gunpowder in warfare, since a slow-burning match fuse was required to ignite the flames. The Chinese applied the use of double-piston bellows to pump petrol out of a single cylinder (with an upstroke and a downstroke), lit at the end by a slow-burning gunpowder match to fire a continuous stream of flame (as referred to in the Wujing Zongyao manuscript of 1044 AD). In the suppression of the Southern Tang state by 976 AD, early Song naval forces confronted them on the Yangtze River in 975 AD. Southern Tang forces attempted to use flamethrowers against the Song navy, but were accidentally consumed by their own fire when violent winds swept in their direction. Documented also in later Chinese publications, illustrations and descriptions of mobile flamethrowers on four-wheel push carts appear in the Wujing Zongyao, written in 1044 AD (its illustration redrawn in 1601 as well). Advances in military technology aided the Song dynasty in its defense against hostile neighbours to the north, including the Mongols.

Islamic World 
Abū ʿAbdallāh al-Khwārazmī in Mafātīḥ al-ʿUlūm (“Keys to the Sciences”) ca. 976 AD mentions the bāb al-midfa and the bāb al-mustaq which he said were parts of naphtha-throwers and projectors (al-naffātāt wa al-zarāqāt). Book of Ingenious Mechanical Device (Kitāb fī ma 'rifat al-ḥiyal al-handasiyya) of 1206 AD by Ibn al-Razzaz al-Jazari mentioned about ejectors of naphtha (zarāqāt al-naft).

19th century 
Although flamethrowers were never used in the American Civil War, the use of Greek fire was threatened, and flamethrowers have been in use in most modern conflicts ever since.

Early 20th century 

The English word flamethrower is a loan-translation of the German word Flammenwerfer, since the modern flamethrower was invented in Germany. The first flamethrower, in the modern sense, is usually credited to Richard Fiedler. He submitted evaluation models of his Flammenwerfer to the German Army in 1901. On depressing a lever the propellant gas forced the flammable oil into and through a rubber tube and over a simple igniting wick device in a steel nozzle. It was a single-shot weapon—for burst firing, a new igniter section was attached each time.

Hungarian Gábor Szakáts invented the flamethrower which was first used by the German army in WWI. Szakáts was the only Hungarian on the list of war criminals assembled by France after the war due to the invention of the flamethrower. Even his birthplace Budapest refused to bury Szakáts because of his invention. It was not until 1911 that the German Army accepted their first real flamethrowing device, creating a specialist regiment of twelve companies equipped with Flammenwerfer Apparent. Despite this, use of fire in a World War I battle predated flamethrower use, with a petrol spray being ignited by an incendiary bomb in the Argonne-Meuse sector in October 1914.

The flamethrower was first used in World War I on 26 February 1915 when it was briefly used against the French outside Verdun. After two days of fighting the British had suffered casualties of 31 officers and 751 other ranks.

The success of the attack prompted the German Army to adopt the device on all fronts. Flamethrowers were used in squads of six during battles, at the start of an attack destroying the enemy and to the preceding the infantry advance.

The German deployed flamethrowers during the war in more than 650 attacks.

The British experimented with flamethrowers in the Battle of the Somme, during which they used experimental weapons called "Livens Large Gallery Flame Projectors", named for their inventor, William Howard Livens, a Royal Engineers officer. This weapon was enormous and completely non-portable. The weapon had an effective range of 90 yards, which proved effective at clearing trenches, but with no other benefit the project was abandoned.

Two Morriss static flamethrowers were mounted in  HMS Vindictive and several Hay portable flamethrowers were deployed by the Royal Navy during the Zeebrugge Raid on 23 April 1918. A British newspaper report of the action referred to the British flamethrowers only as flammenwerfer, using the German word.

The French Army deployed the Schilt family of flamethrowers, which were also used by the Italian Army. The Russian army used 11,446 indigenously produced flamethrowers, over 10,000 of which were the Tovarnitski man-portable design.

In the interwar period, at least four flamethrowers were used in the Chaco War by the Bolivian Army, during the unsuccessful assault on the Paraguayan stronghold of Nanawa in 1933.

World War II 
The flamethrower was used extensively during World War II. In 1939, the Wehrmacht first deployed man-portable flamethrowers against the Polish Post Office in Danzig. Subsequently, in 1942, the U.S. Army introduced its own man-portable flamethrower. The vulnerability of infantry carrying backpack flamethrowers and the weapon's short range led to experiments with tank-mounted flamethrowers (flame tanks), which were used by many countries.

Axis use

Germany

The Germans made considerable use of the weapon (Flammenwerfer 35) during their invasion of the Netherlands and France, against fixed fortifications. World War II German army flamethrowers tended to have one large fuel tank with the pressurizer tank fastened to its back or side. Some German army flamethrowers occupied only the lower part of its wearer's back, leaving the upper part of his back free for an ordinary rucksack.

Flamethrowers soon fell into disfavour. Flamethrowers were extensively used by German units in urban fights in Poland, both in 1943 in the Warsaw Ghetto Uprising and in 1944 in the Warsaw Uprising (see the Stroop Report and the article on the 1943 Warsaw Ghetto Uprising). With the contraction of the Third Reich during the latter half of World War II, a smaller, more compact flamethrower known as the Einstossflammenwerfer 46 was produced.

Germany also used flamethrower vehicles, most of them based on the chassis of the Sd.Kfz. 251 half track and the Panzer II and Panzer III tanks, generally known as Flammpanzers.

The Germans also produced the Abwehrflammenwerfer 42, a flame-mine or flame fougasse, based on a Soviet version of the weapon. This was essentially a disposable, single use flamethrower that was buried alongside conventional land mines at key defensive points and triggered by either a trip-wire or a command wire. One defensive installation found in Italy included seven of the weapons, carefully concealed and wired to a central control point.

Italy

Italy employed man-portable flamethrowers and L3 Lf flame tanks during the Second Italo-Abyssinian War of 1935 to 1936, during the Spanish Civil War, and during World War II. The L3 Lf flame tank was a CV-33 or CV-35 tankette with a flamethrower operating from the machine gun mount. In the Northern Africa Theatre, the L3 Lf flame tank found little to no success.  An L6 Lf flametank was also developed using the L6/40 light tank platform.

Japan

Japan used man-portable flamethrowers to clear fortified positions, in the Battle of Wake Island, Corregidor,  Battle of the Tenaru on the Guadalcanal and Battle of Milne Bay.

Romania
Flamethrowers were also used by the Royal Romanian Army. They were also planned to become self-propelled; the Mareșal tank destroyer was planned to have a command vehicle version armed with machine guns and a flamethrower.

Allies

Britain and the Commonwealth

The British World War II army flamethrowers, "Ack Packs", had a doughnut-shaped fuel tank with a small spherical pressurizer gas tank in the middle. As a result, some troops nicknamed them "lifebuoys". It was officially known as Flamethrower, Portable, No 2.

Extensive plans were made in 1940-1941 by the Petroleum Warfare Department to use flame fougasse static flame projectors in the event of an invasion, with around 50,000 barrel-based incendiary mines being deployed in 7,000 batteries throughout Southern England.

The British hardly used their man-portable systems, relying on Churchill Crocodile tanks in the European theatre. These tanks proved very effective against German defensive positions, and caused official Axis protests against their use. This flamethrower could produce a jet of flame exceeding . There are documented instances of German units summarily executing any captured British flame-tank crews.

In the Pacific theatre, Australian forces used converted Matilda tanks, known as Matilda Frogs.

United States

In the Pacific theatre, the U.S. Army used M-1 and M-2 flamethrowers to clear stubborn Japanese resistance from prepared defenses, caves, and trenches. Starting in New Guinea, through the closing stages on Guadalcanal and during the approach to and reconquest of the Philippines and then through the Okinawa campaign, the Army deployed hand-held, man-portable units.

Often flamethrower teams were made up of combat engineer units, later with troops of the chemical warfare service. The Army fielded more flamethrower units than the Marine Corps, and the Army's Chemical Warfare Service pioneered tank mounted flamethrowers on Sherman tanks (CWS-POA H-4). All the flamethrower tanks on Okinawa belonged to the 713th Provisional Tank Battalion.  It was tasked with supporting all U.S. Army and Marine infantry.  All Pacific mechanized flamethrower units were trained by Seabee specialists with Col. Unmacht's CWS Flamethrower Group in Hawaii.

The U.S. Army used flamethrowers in Europe in much smaller numbers, though they were available for special employments. Flamethrowers were deployed during the Normandy landings in order to clear Axis fortifications.  Also, most boat teams on Omaha Beach included a two-man flamethrower team.

The Marine Corps used the backpack-type M2A1-7 and M2-2 flamethrowers, finding them useful in clearing Japanese trench and bunker complexes. The first known USMC use of the man portable flamethrower was against the formidable defenses at Tarawa in November 1943. The Marines pioneered the use of Ronson-equipped M-3 Stuart tanks in the Marianas. These were known as SATAN flame tanks. Though effective, they lacked the armour to safely engage fortifications and were phased out in favour of the better-armoured M4 Sherman tanks. USMC Flamethrower Shermans were produced at Schofield Barracks by Seabees attached to the Chemical Warfare Service under Col. Unmacht. CWS designated M4s with "CWS-POA-H" for "Chemical Warfare Service Pacific Ocean Area, Hawaii" plus a flamethrower number. The Marines had previously deployed large Navy flamethrowers mounted on LVT-4 AMTRACs at Peleliu. Late in the war, both services operated LVT-4 and -5 amphibious flametanks in limited numbers. Both the Army and the Marines still used their infantry-portable systems, despite the arrival of adapted Sherman tanks with the Ronson system (cf. flame tanks).

In cases where the Japanese were entrenched in deep caves, the flames often consumed the available oxygen, suffocating the occupants.  Many Japanese troops interviewed post war said they were terrified more by flamethrowers than any other American weapon. Flamethrower operators were often the first U.S. troops targeted.

Soviet Union 

The FOG-1 and -2 flamethrowers were stationary devices used in defense. They could also be categorized as a projecting incendiary mine. The FOG had only one cylinder of fuel, which was compressed using an explosive charge and projected through a nozzle. The November 1944 issue of the US War Department Intelligence Bulletin refers to these "Fougasse flame throwers" being used in the Soviet defense of Stalingrad. The FOG-1 was directly copied by the Germans as the Abwehrflammenwerfer 42.

Unlike the flamethrowers of the other powers during World War II, the Soviets were the only ones to consciously attempt to camouflage their infantry flamethrowers. With the ROKS-2 flamethrower this was done by disguising the flame projector as a standard issue rifle, such as the Mosin–Nagant, and the fuel tanks as a standard infantryman's rucksack. This was to try to stop the flamethrower operator from being specifically targeted by enemy fire. This "rifle" had a working action which was used to cycle blank igniter cartridges.

1945-1980

US military 

The United States Marines used flamethrowers in the Korean and Vietnam Wars. The M132 armoured flamethrower, an M113 armored personnel carrier with a mounted flamethrower, was successfully used in the conflict.

Flamethrowers have not been in the U.S. arsenal since 1978, when the Department of Defense unilaterally stopped using them ⁠— ⁠the last American infantry flamethrower was the Vietnam-era M9-7. They have been deemed of questionable effectiveness in modern combat, though some have made the case for their tactical employment.  Despite some assertions, they are not generally banned, but as incendiary weapons they are subject to the usage prohibitions described under Protocol III of the Convention on Certain Conventional Weapons.

USA army flamethrowers developed up to the M9 model. In the M9 the propellant tank is a sphere below the left fuel tank and does not project backwards.

Post 1980's

Non-flamethrower incendiary weapons remain in modern military arsenals. Thermobaric weapons  may have been fielded in Afghanistan by the United States (2008)  and have been used by Russia in Ukraine (2022). The USA and USSR both developed a rocket launcher specifically for the deployment of incendiary munitions, respectively the M202 FLASH and the RPO "Rys" ancestor of the RPO-A Shmel.

Provisional IRA 
In the last stages of the Troubles, during the mid-1980s, the IRA smuggled a number of Soviet LPO-50 military flamethrowers (supplied to them by the Libyan government) into Northern Ireland. They used one of these flamethrowers, among other weapons, to storm a British Army permanent checkpoint in Derryard, near Rosslea, on 13 December 1989. Some months later, on 4 March 1990, the IRA attacked an RUC station in Stewartstown, County Tyrone, using an improvised flamethrower consisting of a manure-spreader towed by a tractor to spray 600 imperial gallons (2,700 L) of a petrol/diesel mix to engulf the base in flames, and then opened fire with rifles and an anti-tank rocket launcher. Another IRA unit carried two attacks in less than a year with another improvised flamethrower towed by a tractor on a British Army watchtower, the Borucki sangar, in Crossmaglen, County Armagh, also in the early 1990s. The first incident occurred on 12 December 1992, when the bunker was manned by Scots Guards, and the second on 12 November 1993. The device used as launcher was also a manure spreader, which doused the facility with fuel, ignited few seconds later by a small explosion. In the 1993 action, a nine-metre-high fireball engulfed the tower for seven minutes. The four Grenadier Guards inside the outpost were rescued by a Saxon armoured vehicle. Incendiary improvised devices were also proven by the republican paramilitaries, like in an IRA  grenade attack on a British Army patrol on 4 April 1993 in Carrickmore, County Tyrone; the device consisted of 2 lb (0.91 kg) of semtex and 5 imperial gallons (22.5 L) of petrol; the bomb exploded, but the fuel failed to ignite. A soldier was thrown several meters across the road by the blast.

Russo-Ukrainian War 
On 8 February 2017, separatist leader Mikhail 'Givi' Tolstykh was killed when an RPO-A Shmel rocket was fired at his office at Donetsk city.

On 21 November 2022, nine months into the Russian invasion of Ukraine, Russian sources claim that artillery and "heavy flamethrowers" were employed against a Ukrainian concentration of troops near Kupyansk, Kharkiv Oblast. Russian sources use the term "heavy flamethrowers" to describe TOS-1 multiple thermobaric rocket launchers.

Owning a personal flamethrower

In the United States, private ownership of a flamethrower is not restricted by federal law, because a flamethrower is a tool, not a firearm. Flamethrowers are legal in 48 states and restricted in California and Maryland.

In California, unlicensed possession of a flame-throwing device—statutorily defined as "any non-stationary and transportable device designed or intended to emit or propel a burning stream of combustible or flammable liquid a distance of at least " H&W 12750 (a)—is a misdemeanor punishable with a county jail term not exceeding one year or with a fine not exceeding $10,000 (CA H&W 12761). Licenses to use flamethrowers are issued by the state fire marshal, and they may use any criteria for issuing or not issuing that license which is deemed fit, but must publish those criteria in the California Code of Regulations, Title 11, Section 970 et seq.

In the United Kingdom, flamethrowers are "prohibited weapons" under section 5(1)(b) of the Firearms Act 1968 and article 45(1)(f) of the Firearms (Northern Ireland) Order 2004 and possession of a flamethrower would carry a sentence of up to ten years' imprisonment. In 1994, a man attacked school pupils at Sullivan Upper School, just outside Belfast, with a home-made flamethrower.

A South African inventor brought the Blaster car-mounted flamethrower to market in 1998 as a security device to defend against carjackers. It has since been discontinued, with the inventor moving on to pocket-sized self-defence flamethrowers.

Elon Musk, CEO of Tesla, Inc. and owner of SpaceX, developed a "not a flamethrower" for public sale through his business, The Boring Company, selling 20,000 units. This device uses propane gas rather than a stream of liquid fuel, making it more akin to a torch, like those commonly available at home and garden centres.

Other uses 
Flamethrowers are occasionally used for igniting controlled burns for land management and agriculture. For example, in the production of sugar cane, where canebrakes are burned to get rid of the dry dead leaves which clog harvesters, and incidentally kill any lurking venomous snakes. More commonly, a driptorch or a flare (fusee) is used.

U.S. troops allegedly used flamethrowers on the streets of Washington, D.C. (mentioned in a December 1998 article in the San Francisco Flier), as one of several clearance methods used for the surprisingly large amount of snow that fell before the presidential inauguration of John F. Kennedy. A history article on the U.S. Army Corps of Engineers notes, "In the end, the task force employed hundreds of dump trucks, front-end loaders, sanders, plows, rotaries, and allegedly flamethrowers to clear the way".

A squad armed with backpack flamethrowers had an important part in the 2012 Summer Paralympics closing ceremony. They had one big tank each.

In April 2014 it was reported  by South Korea's Chosun Ilbo newspaper without confirmation that a North Korean government official, O Sang-Hon, Deputy Minister at the Ministry of Public Security, was executed by flamethrower.

It has been known for police to fill a "flamethrower", not with flammable liquid, but rather with tear gas dissolved in water as a riot-control device; see Converted Flamethrower 40.

See also 
Dragon's breath
Early thermal weapons
Flame gun
Huo Long Jing
List of flamethrowers
M202A1 FLASH
Meng Huo You
Molotov cocktail
Petroleum Warfare Department
Technology of Song dynasty

Citations

General bibliography 

 - Total pages: 824

External links 

 First World War.com: Weapons of War: Flamethrowers
 Weapons of the World War II gyrene: Flamethrowers
 Howstuffworks "How Flamethrowers Work"
 Jaeger Platoon: Portable flame-throwers
 A history of flamethrowers
 Image of flamethrower in use
 Images, including a tank-mounted flamethrower's nozzle
 The Pen Huo Qi
 History and images of Australian flamethrowers
 WWII German army flamethrowers
 Modern Russian Flamethrowers, page in Russian
 USA-type flamethrower in use
 M42B1 Flamethrower Sherman Tank at U.S. Veterans Memorial Museum

 
Articles containing video clips
Incendiary weapons
Infantry weapons
Light sources